The 2020 Football Northern Territory season in Northern Territory. The men's competitions consisted of three major divisions across the State.

League table

2020 NorZone Premier League
The season began on 13 March, concluding with the Grand Final on 10 October.

Finals series

2020 NorZone Division One
The season began on 15 March, concluding with the Grand Final on 27 September.

Finals series

2020 Southern Zone Premier League
The season began on 6 June, concluding with the Grand Final on 3 October.

Notes

Finals series

References

2020 in Australian soccer
Soccer in the Northern Territory